Margaret Sheridan may refer to:

Margaret Sheridan (actress) (1926–1982), American actress
Margaret Sheridan (writer) (1912–1980), British writer
Margaret Burke Sheridan (1889–1959), Irish opera singer